Giovanni Bongiorni (born 8 July 1956) is a former Italian sprinter who specialized in the 200 metres.

Biography
His personal best 200 metres time was 20.82 seconds, achieved in July 1981 in Turin. His personal best 100 metres time was 10.60 seconds, achieved in July 1982 in Rome. His daughter Anna Bongiorni is a sprinter of the Italy national athletics team.

Achievements

National titles
Bongiorni won two national championships at individual senior level.

Italian Athletics Championships
200 m: 1981 
Italian Athletics Indoor Championships
200 m: 1986

See also
 Italy national relay team

References

External links
 

1956 births
Living people
Italian male sprinters
Athletes (track and field) at the 1984 Summer Olympics
Olympic athletes of Italy
Italian Athletics Championships winners